Brett Maverick Phillips (born May 30, 1994) is an American professional baseball outfielder for the Los Angeles Angels of Major League Baseball (MLB). He has previously played in MLB for the Milwaukee Brewers, Kansas City Royals, Tampa Bay Rays, and Baltimore Orioles.

Early life
Phillips attended Seminole High School in Seminole, Florida. He graduated in 2012.

Professional career

Houston Astros
The Houston Astros selected Phillips in the sixth round of the 2012 MLB draft. He signed with the Astros rather than play college baseball at North Carolina State University.

In 2012, Phillips made his professional debut with the Gulf Coast Astros of the Rookie-level Gulf Coast League, hitting .251 in 54 games. He played in 41 games in 2013 between the Greeneville Astros of the Rookie-level Appalachian League and Quad Cities River Bandits of the Class A Midwest League, hitting .242/.347/.331 in 157 at-bats.

Phillips started 2014 back with Quad Cities and was promoted to the Lancaster JetHawks of the Class A-Advanced California League after posting a .883 on-base plus slugging (OPS) and 13 home runs in 103 games. He finished the year hitting .310/.375/.529 with 17 home runs and was named the Astros' Minor League Player of the Year after the season.

Milwaukee Brewers
On July 30, 2015, the Astros traded Phillips, Domingo Santana, Josh Hader, and Adrian Houser to the Milwaukee Brewers for Carlos Gómez and Mike Fiers. He finished the season with the Biloxi Shuckers of the Class AA Southern League. The Brewers invited Phillips to spring training, where he was to compete to be the Brewers center fielder for the 2016 season. However, he strained an oblique muscle and was sent to minor league camp before he could appear in a game. The Brewers opted to assign Phillips to Biloxi to start the 2016 season. The Brewers added him to their 40-man roster after the season. He started the 2017 season with the Colorado Springs Sky Sox of the Class AAA Pacific Coast League.

On June 5, 2017, Phillips was called up to the Brewers to make his MLB debut. In limited action, he hit .276 with four homers and 12 RBI, and set a Statcast record with a  throw against the Pittsburgh Pirates to put David Freese out at home plate.

Phillips began the 2018 season in the minors and only saw 24 plate appearances with the Brewers, hitting .182 with 11 strikeouts, a .523 OPS and 4 RBIs.

Kansas City Royals
On July 27, 2018, Phillips and Jorge López were traded to the Kansas City Royals in exchange for Mike Moustakas. In 2019, Phillips slashed .138/.247/.262 with two home runs and six RBI in 30 games. From August 9, 2020, to August 27, 2020, Phillips received only six plate appearances for the Royals.

Tampa Bay Rays
On August 27, 2020, the Royals traded Phillips to the Tampa Bay Rays in exchange for Lucius Fox. He was activated on September 4, making his Rays debut as a pinch-runner in a 5–4 victory over the Miami Marlins. On October 24, in Game 4 of the 2020 World Series against the Los Angeles Dodgers, Phillips recorded his first career postseason hit, a walk-off single in the bottom of the ninth inning that yielded two runs (one coming on an error), giving the Rays an 8–7 victory. He became the first player since Kirk Gibson in 1988 to have a walk-off hit with two outs with his team trailing in the World Series.

On July 2, 2021, Phillips made his first career pitching appearance in a blowout loss against the Toronto Blue Jays, and pitched one inning, allowing one run on an RBI single to Santiago Espinal.

Between July 29 and August 11, 2021, Phillips hit three grand slams in only 19 plate appearances, second only to Jim Northrup who did so in 14 appearances in 1968. Then on August 16, 2021, he hit an inside-the-park home run, and the combination of three slams plus one inside-the-park home run in only 19 days broke a record held by Babe Ruth, who accomplished the same feat in 36 days in 1929.

He was designated for assignment on August 1, 2022 following the Rays' trade acquisition of José Siri from the Houston Astros.

Baltimore Orioles
Phillips was acquired by the Baltimore Orioles for cash considerations at the trade deadline one day later on August 2. The back of his Orioles jersey featured his surname above uniform number 66, a word play on the name of an American multinational energy company. After going 2-for-17 with two doubles and nine strikeouts, he was replaced by Kyle Stowers on the team's 40-man roster and designated for assignment seventeen days later on August 19. He cleared waivers and was outrighted to the Norfolk Tides three days later on August 22. He would've forfeited more than $300,000 remaining on his $1.4 million salary for 2022 had he elected to become a free agent. He elected free agency on October 6, 2022.

Los Angeles Angels
On January 9, 2023, the Los Angeles Angels signed Phillips to a one-year, $1.2 million deal.

Personal life
Phillips is married to Brianna Hillman Phillips, the daughter of Miami Marlins third base coach Trey Hillman. They live in Largo, Florida. He is a Christian.

See also
 Houston Astros award winners and league leaders

References

External links

1994 births
Living people
Baltimore Orioles players
Baseball players from Florida
Biloxi Shuckers players
Colorado Springs Sky Sox players
Corpus Christi Hooks players
Greeneville Astros players
Gulf Coast Astros players
Kansas City Royals players
Lancaster JetHawks players
Major League Baseball outfielders
Milwaukee Brewers players
People from Seminole, Florida
Quad Cities River Bandits players
Salt River Rafters players
Surprise Saguaros players
Tampa Bay Rays players
Twitch (service) streamers
United States national baseball team players
2015 WBSC Premier12 players